Oba Kohida Priye is a 2001 Sri Lankan Sinhala action family film directed by Hemasiri Sellapperuma and produced by Sugathadasa Marasinghe for Sinhagiri Films. It stars Sanath Gunathilake and Sabeetha Perera in lead roles along with Ranjan Ramanayake, and Freddie Silva. Music composed by Sarath Dassanayake. It is the 950th Sri Lankan film in the Sinhala cinema.

Plot

Cast
 Sanath Gunathilake as George Madanayake
 Sabeetha Perera Dual role as Nilmini, Nimmi
 Ranjan Ramanayake as Priyantha
 Freddie Silva as Dulcy
 Wilson Karunaratne as Wilson
 Bandu Samarasinghe as Princy
 Rex Kodippili as Mr. Madanayake
 Manel Chandralatha 
 Teddy Vidyalankara as Teddy

Soundtrack

References

2001 films
2000s Sinhala-language films